The Four Great Inventions are inventions from ancient China that are celebrated in Chinese culture for their historical significance and as symbols of ancient China's advanced science and technology. They are the compass, gunpowder, papermaking and printing.

China held the world's leading position in many fields in the study of nature from the 1st century BC to the 15th century AD, with the four great inventions having the greatest global significance.

These four inventions had a profound impact on the development of civilization throughout the world. However, some modern Chinese scholars have opined that other Chinese inventions were perhaps more sophisticated and had a greater impact on Chinese civilization – the Four Great Inventions serve merely to highlight the technological interaction between East and West.

Evolution 
“The Three Great Inventions” was first proposed by the British philosopher Francis Bacon, and later by Walter Henry Medhurst, Karl Marx and other scholars agreed.

Printing, gunpowder, and the mariner's compass were brought to Europe by Arab traders during the Renaissance and Reformation. Bacon, a leading philosopher, politician, and adviser to King James I of England, wrote: “It is well to observe the force and virtue and consequence of discoveries. These are to be seen nowhere more clearly than those three which were unknown to the ancients [the Greeks], and of which the origin, though recent, is obscure and inglorious; namely printing, gunpowder, and the magnet. For these three have changed the whole face and stage of things throughout the world, the first in literature, the second in warfare, the third in navigation; whence have followed innumerable changes; insomuch that no empire, no sect, no star, seems to have exerted greater power and influence in human affairs than these three mechanical discoveries.”

Including Marx's comments:"Gunpowder, compass, and printing-these are the three major inventions that foretell the arrival of bourgeois society. Gunpowder blasted the knight class to pieces, the compass opened the world market and established colonies, and printing became a tool of Protestantism. In general, it has become a means of scientific renaissance, and has become the most powerful lever to create the necessary preconditions for spiritual development."Then, British Sinologist Medhurst pointed out:"The Chinese people's genius for inventions has manifested in many aspects very early. The three Chinese inventions (navigation compass, printing, gunpowder) have provided an extraordinary impetus to the development of European civilization."Joseph Edkins, a Chinese missionary and sinologist, was the first to add papermaking to the three major inventions mentioned above, and in comparing Japan and China he noted that "we must always remember that they (meaning Japan) have no such remarkable inventions as printing, papermaking, the compass, and gunpowder."

Papermaking 

Papermaking has traditionally been traced to China about AD 105, when Cai Lun, an official attached to the imperial court during the Han dynasty (202 BC – AD 220), created a sheet of paper using mulberry and other bast fibres along with fishing net, old rags, and hemp waste. However, a recent archaeological discovery has been reported from Gansu of paper with Chinese characters on it dating to 8 BC.

While paper used for wrapping and padding was used in China since the 2nd century BC, paper used as a writing medium only became widespread by the 3rd century. By the 6th century in China, sheets of paper were beginning to be used for toilet paper as well. During the Tang dynasty (618–907) paper was folded and sewn into square bags to preserve the flavor of tea. The Song dynasty (960–1279) that followed was the first government to issue paper currency.

Before paper was invented, the ancient Chinese carved characters on pottery, animal bones and stones, cast them on bronzes, or wrote them on bamboo or wooden strips and silk fabric. These materials, however, were either too heavy or too expensive for widespread use. The invention and use of paper brought about a revolution in writing materials, paving the way for the invention of printing technology in the years to come.

Compass 

The compass in the Four Great Inventions was formerly the compass of ancient China. It is a kind of direction-indicating tool, which is widely used in navigation, field exploration and other fields. In ancient times, it had a profound influence on trade, war and cultural exchange.

The compass's origins may be traced back to the Warring States period (476–221 BC), when Chinese people utilized a device known as a si nan to point in the right direction.

During the early Song dynasty, a spherical compass with a small needle made of magnetic steel was created after steady development. The little needle has one end pointing south and the other pointing north. During the Northern Song dynasty (960–1127), the compass was brought to the Arab world and Europe.

People relied on interpreting the positions of the sun, moon, and pole stars to tell directions on open ocean or new area before the discovery of the compass. When the weather was gloomy or severe, traveling was difficult.

A lodestone compass was used in China during the Han dynasty between the 2nd century BC and 1st century AD, where it was called the "south-governor" (sīnán ). The earliest reference to a magnetic device used for navigation is in a Song dynasty book dated to 1040–1044, where there is a description of an iron "south-pointing fish" floating in a bowl of water, aligning itself to the south. The device is recommended as a means of orientation "in the obscurity of the night." The first suspended magnetic needle compass was written of by Shen Kuo in his book of 1088.

According to Needham, the Chinese in the Song dynasty and continuing Yuan dynasty did make use of a dry compass.

The dry compass used in China was a dry suspension compass, a wooden frame crafted in the shape of a turtle hung upside down by a board, with the lodestone sealed in by wax, and if rotated, the needle at the tail would always point in the northern cardinal direction. Although the 14th-century European compass-card in box frame and dry pivot needle was adopted in China after its use was taken by Japanese pirates in the 16th century (who had in turn learned of it from Europeans), the Chinese design of the suspended dry compass persisted in use well into the 18th century.

People could readily locate a direction when sailing on large oceans and exploring new area with the creation of the round compass, which led to the discovery of the New World and the development of sailing ships.

Gunpowder 

Originally, gunpowder was used to make fireworks for festivals and major events. It was later utilized as an explosive substance in cannons, fire-arrows, and other military weapons. During the Song and Yuan dynasties (960–1368), gunpower was in high demand due to numerous battles and the development of mass industry.

Gunpowder was invented in the 9th century by Chinese alchemists searching for an elixir of immortality. By the time the Song dynasty treatise, Wujing Zongyao (武经总要), was written by Zeng Gongliang and Yang Weide in 1044, the various Chinese formulas for gunpowder held levels of nitrate in the range of 27% to 50%. By the end of the 12th century, Chinese formulas of gunpowder had a level of nitrate capable of bursting through cast iron metal containers, in the form of the earliest hollow, gunpowder-filled grenade bombs.

In 1280, the bomb store of the large gunpowder arsenal at Weiyang accidentally caught fire, which produced such a large explosion that a team of inspectors at the site a week later deduced that 100 guards had been killed instantly, with wooden beams and pillars blown sky high and landing at a distance of over 10 li (~2 mi or ~3 km) away from the explosion.

By the time of Hanzo Yu and his Huolongjing (which describes military applications of gunpowder in great detail) in the mid-14th century, the explosive potential of gunpowder was perfected, as the level of nitrate in gunpowder formulas had risen to a range of 12% to 91%, with at least 6 different formulas in use that are considered to have maximum explosive potential for gunpowder. By that time, the Chinese had invented how to create explosive round shot by packing their hollow shells with this nitrate-enhanced gunpowder. An excavated trove of early Ming land mines showed that corned gunpowder was present in China by 1370. There is evidence suggesting that corned powder may have been used in East Asia as early as the thirteenth century.

Printing 

During the Tang dynasty, printing was created in China (AD 618–906). The first mention of printing is in an AD 593 imperial decree by the Sui Emperor Wen-ti, who mandates the printing of Buddhist pictures and scriptures.

Woodblock printing 
Blocks made from wood were used in the oldest type of Chinese printing. Printing textiles and reproducing Buddhist scriptures were also done using these blocks. Short religious writings were carried as charms in this manner.

The Chinese invention of woodblock printing, at some point before the first dated book in 868 (the Diamond Sutra), produced the world's first print culture. According to A. Hyatt Mayor, curator at the Metropolitan Museum of Art, "it was the Chinese who really invented the means of communication that was to dominate until our age." Woodblock printing was better suited to Chinese characters than movable type, which the Chinese also invented, but which did not replace woodblock printing. Western printing presses, although introduced in the 16th century, were not widely used in China until the 19th century. China, along with Korea, was one of the last countries to adopt them.

Woodblock printing for textiles, on the other hand, preceded text printing by centuries in all cultures, and is first found in China at around 220. It reached Europe by the 14th century or before, via the Islamic world, and by around 1400 was being used on paper for old master prints and playing cards.

Moveable type printing 
Printing in Northern China was further advanced by the 11th century, as it was written by the Song dynasty scientist and statesman Shen Kuo (1031–1095) that the common artisan Bi Sheng (990-1051) invented ceramic movable type printing. Then there were those such as Wang Zhen (fl. 1290–1333) who invented respectively wooden type setting, which later influenced developing metal moveable type printing in Korea (1372-1377). Movable type printing was a tedious process if one were to assemble thousands of individual characters for the printing of simply one or a few books, but if used for printing thousands of books, the process was efficient and rapid enough to be successful and highly employed. Indeed, there were many cities in China where movable type printing, in wooden and metal form, was adopted by the enterprises of wealthy local families or large private industries. The Qing dynasty court sponsored enormous printing projects using woodblock movable type printing during the 18th century. Although superseded by western printing techniques, woodblock movable type printing remains in use in isolated communities in China.

Analysis 

Although Chinese culture is replete with lists of significant works or achievements (e.g. Four Great Beauties, Four Great Classical Novels, Four Books and Five Classics, etc.), the concept of the Four Great Inventions originated from the West, and is adapted from the European intellectual and rhetorical commonplace of the Three Great (or, more properly, Greatest) Inventions. This commonplace spread rapidly throughout Europe in the 16th century and was appropriated only in modern times by sinologists and Chinese scholars. The origin of the Three Great Inventions—these being the printing press, firearms, and the nautical compass—was originally ascribed to Europe, and specifically to Germany in the case of the printing press and firearms. These inventions were a badge of honor to modern Europeans, who proclaimed that there was nothing to equal them among the ancient Greeks and Romans. After reports by Portuguese sailors and Spanish missionaries began to filter back to Europe beginning in the 1530s, the notion that these inventions had existed for centuries in China took hold. By 1620, when Francis Bacon wrote in his Instauratio magna that "printing, gunpowder, and the nautical compass . . . have altered the face and state of the world: first, in literary matters; second, in warfare; third, in navigation," this was hardly an original idea to most learned Europeans.

In the 19th century, Karl Marx commented on the importance of gunpowder, the compass and printing, "Gunpowder, the compass, and the printing press were the three great inventions which ushered in bourgeois society. Gunpowder blew up the knightly class, the compass discovered the world market and found the colonies, and the printing press was the instrument of Protestantism and the regeneration of science in general; the most powerful lever for creating the intellectual prerequisites."

Western writers and scholars from the 19th century onwards commonly attributed these inventions to China. The missionary and sinologist Joseph Edkins (1823–1905), comparing China with Japan, noted that for all of Japan's virtues, it did not make inventions as significant as paper-making, printing, the compass and gunpowder. Edkins' notes on these inventions were mentioned in an 1859 review in the journal Athenaeum, comparing the contemporary science and technology in China and Japan. Other examples include, in Johnson's New Universal Cyclopædia: A Scientific and Popular Treasury of Useful Knowledge in 1880, The Chautauquan in 1887, and by the sinologist, Berthold Laufer in 1915. None of these, however, referred to four inventions or called them "great."

In the 20th century, this list was popularized and augmented by the noted British biochemist, historian, and sinologist Joseph Needham, who devoted the later part of his life to studying the science and civilization of ancient China.

Recently, scholars have questioned the importance placed on the inventions of paper, printing, gunpowder, and the compass. Chinese scholars in particular question if too much emphasis is given to these inventions, over other significant Chinese inventions. They have pointed out that other inventions in China were perhaps more sophisticated and had a greater impact within China.

In the chapter "Are the Four Major Inventions the Most Important?" of his book Ancient Chinese Inventions, Chinese historian Deng Yinke writes:

Cultural influence 

In 2005, the Hong Kong postal service created a special stamp issue that featured the Four Great Inventions. The stamp series was first issued on August 18, 2005, during a ceremony where an enlarged first day cover was stamped. Allan Chiang (Postmaster General) and Prof. Chu Ching-wu (president of the Hong Kong University of Science and Technology) marked the issue of the special stamps by personally stamping the first day cover.

The Four Great Inventions was featured as one of the main themes of the opening ceremony of the 2008 Beijing Summer Olympics. Paper making was represented with a dance and an ink drawing on a huge piece of paper, printing by a set of dancing printing blocks, a replica of an ancient compass was showcased, and gunpowder by the extensive firework displays during the ceremony. A survey by the Beijing Social Facts & Public Opinion Survey Center found that Beijing residents found the program on the Four Great Inventions the most moving part of the opening ceremony.

Other important inventions 
Other significant innovations were made, however they are not included among the top four. Silk and porcelain were the most important for world profit and the growth of the various empires' economy.

They were valuable commercial items exchanged along the Silk Road routes, and when the processes for producing them were understood in Europe and the Islamic world, large businesses grew in both.

See also 

 Dream Pool Essays
 History of science and technology in China
 List of Chinese inventions
 Science and technology of the Han dynasty
 Technology of the Song dynasty

Notes

References 

 
 
 
 
 
 
 
 

History of science and technology in China
Chinese inventions